The Why Why Family (also known as Saban's The Why Why Family) is an animated children's television series, which originally aired in 1996, produced by Saban International Paris and Saban Entertainment. The show was broadcast internationally on Fox Kids. Character designs and comedy elements emulate vintage cartoons. 

In the United States, the series aired as part of a syndicated strand of Saban programmes called the "Saban Kids Network". With the series airing on the strand to the guidelines of the Federal Communications Commission, it marked Saban's first entry into the educational television market. However, the series was cancelled by Saban on December 2, 1996, due to low ratings.

Ownership of the series passed to Disney in 2001 when Disney acquired Fox Kids Worldwide, which also includes Saban Entertainment. The series is not available on Disney+.

Synopsis
Start to the intro: Victor (off-screen) summarizes what his family members will teach him in the episode.
The episodes are divided into are five parts. In each segment, Victor asks a family member a popular scientific question, following an extensive answer by the family member with a particular expertise in the field of science involved in the question. Each of these episodes has its short intro and The End sketches for the specific characters. Each sketch title is <(character name/s) in (episode title vis-a-vis topic)>.
Ending gag: Max asks Victor "Well Victor, what did you learn today?" to which he begins with "Tons of neat stuff", summarizing what his family members learned him. Max answers, "Sounds like a real big day." and Victor concludes, "It was, but I still have plenty of questions left for next time."

Characters
Victor
A baby and the main protagonist of the series. All times he has questions (though these are smarter ones) to explain his family members like any other kid.
Max — Technology and electronics
The intelligent father of Victor and a stereotypical mechanic/handyman. He is Vanilla's husband, Eartha and Matik's son and Micro and Scopo's brother. He seems to be the closest to Victor compared to the others. Resembles his mother Eartha and is never seen without his cap.
Vanilla and birds Kwik and Kwak — Botany and zoology
Vanilla is Max's wife, Eartha and Matik's daughter-in-law, Micro and Scopo's sister-in-law, and Victor's mother who he resembles. Kwik and Kwak are running gags of their episodes and normally argue.
Eartha (as her name suggests) and Basalt the dinosaur — Geography, geology and meteorology
Eartha is Matik's wife, Max, Micro and Scopo's mother, Vanilla's mother-in-law, and Victor's grandmother who is occasionally uncool. Basalt is a green dinosaur with orange spots, has a Japanese-American accent, can be greedy and transforms into any modes of transport. Eartha is also the one who cooks for their family.
Micro and Scopo — Biology of the human body
Victor's uncles and Max's brothers who are running gags. Micro is stubby and wears a white cowboy hat (is sometimes seen without it), does most of the statements in their episodes. Scopo is the larger and crazier of the brothers, being the test subject yet expresses his own knowledge for some reason. They both have what look like glasses, masks and 'dog ears' like their father Matik.
Matik and dog Zygo — Astronomy and the Universe
Matik is Victor's grandfather, Max, Micro and Scopo's father, and Eartha's husband who has 'dog ears' and is never seen without his pilot hat. Zygo sounds like Daffy Duck from Looney Tunes and has webbed limbs.

Episodes

Voice cast
 Sammy Lane
 Heidi Lenhart
 Mendi Segal
 Stanley Gurd Jr. as Max
 Derek Patrick as Matik
 Genghis Studebaker as Zygo
 Kevin Schon as Micro (uncredited)
 Julie Maddalena as Victor (uncredited)

Crew
 Jamie Simone – Voice Director
 Bruno Bianchi - Producer, Director

References

External links
 

1990s American animated television series
1996 American television series debuts
1990s French animated television series
1996 French television series debuts
American children's animated education television series
American children's animated science fiction television series
French children's animated education television series
French children's animated science fiction television series
Science education television series
Television series by Saban Entertainment